Sleeping Silenus is a bronze relief by Flemish sculptor François Duquesnoy. The original relief in marble was completed by Duquesnoy in the early 17th century. The original Sleeping Silenus is known today only through copies. A well-preserved version in bronze is currently housed at Rubenshuis in Antwerp.

Relief

According to Bellori, the Silenus relief is "an invention according to the poetry of Virgil." Virgil's fourth eclogue goes thusly:

In a cave, two boysChromis, and Mnasylos, Silenus found Lying asleep, all swollen with the wine Of yesterday, as always he is seen. His garlands lay beyond, fall'n from his head; His heavy wine-jar from worn handle hung: They seize him (for he oft had promised fair To sing them songs) and bind, with his own wreaths Now comes the fairest of the Naiads near, Ægle, encouraging the coward boys, And, as he opes his eyes, she with the juice Of mulberries, stains his brows and temples red.

In the relief, Silenus is leaning against a vitis, sleeping off his intoxication. Some putti are tying him up with shoots, while a nymph, Aegle, is smearing his face with mulberries. To the right, there are satyrs prodding Silenus' donkey, opening its mouth to make it stand up.

The version housed at the Rubenshuis was cast in bronze, with an expensive background in lapis lazuli. The Antwerp relief might come from the collection of Philip IV of Spain, where it might have arrived as a gift from Francesco Barberini, perhaps together with Duquesnoy's Bacchanal of Putti, which according to Bellori was indeed sent as a gift to the king by Barberini.

References

Further reading

External links

 Sleeping Silenus at the Rubenshuis official website
 Sleeping Silenus at the Web Gallery of Art

1620s sculptures
1630s sculptures
Sculptures in Belgium
Sculptures by François Duquesnoy
Bronze sculptures
Bronze sculptures in Belgium
Reliefs
Adaptations of works by Virgil
Silenus